The following is a list of bus routes operating in the Twin Cities metropolitan area. A majority of routes are operated by Metro Transit, but some are operated by suburban "opt-out" providers or are under contract. There are two light rail lines, four bus rapid transit lines, and one commuter rail line. Almost all routes operate within the seven county metro area defined by the Metropolitan Council.

METRO and Northstar

METRO is the branding used for High Frequency, high capacity light rail and bus rapid transit lines operated by Metro Transit. There are seven further rapid transit lines in advanced planning or under construction.

Minnesota's only commuter rail line, Northstar, operates northwest from Minneapolis. A shuttle bus, Northstar Link, extends the service to Saint Cloud.

Routes 1–99 (Minneapolis–Saint Paul)
Routes 1–99 are urban local bus routes primarily in Minneapolis and Saint Paul, often running into the first-ring suburbs. Most routes are operated by Metro Transit, however some low-ridership routes are operated contracted to private operators through the Metropolitan Council. Routes 1–49 are Minneapolis-anchored lines, 50–59 are limited-stop lines, Routes 60–89 are Saint Paul-anchored lines, and Route 94 is an express line between the two downtowns.

Routes 100–199 (Minneapolis–Saint Paul)
Routes 100–199 are a mix of services anchored around Minneapolis and the University of Minnesota, often running into the first-ring suburbs and Saint Paul. Routes 110-119 urban local to non-stop service primarily in Minneapolis to the University of Minnesota. Routes 120–124 are free Campus Shuttle services operated by the University of Minnesota. Route 129 extends westbound Interstate 94 buses to the University of Minnesota, often from Saint Paul. Routes 130–199 are urban local to non-stop service to Downtown Minneapolis.

Routes 200–299 (Northeast)
Routes 200–299 are routes operating from the northeast suburbs. Routes 200–249 consist of suburban local service, often operated by contracts through the Metropolitan Council. Routes 250–299 are non-stop services to Downtown Minneapolis, Downtown Saint Paul, and the University of Minnesota.

Routes 300–399 (East)
Routes 300–399 are routes operating from the east suburbs. Routes 300–349 consist of suburban local service, often operated by contracts through the Metropolitan Council. Routes 350–399 are non-stop services to Downtown Minneapolis and Downtown Saint Paul. Eastbound I-94 buses stop on request at Huron Boulevard, providing access to the University of Minnesota.

Routes 400–499 (South)
Routes 400–499 serve Dakota County and Scott County. Many are operated by Minnesota Valley Transit Authority

Routes 500–599 (South)
Routes 500–599 are routes operating from the south suburbs. Routes 500–549 consist of suburban local service, often operated by contracts through the Metropolitan Council. Routes 550–599 are non-stop services to Downtown Minneapolis and the University of Minnesota.

Routes 600–699 (Southwest)
Routes 600–699 are routes operating from the southwest suburbs, with a notable majority being SouthWest Transit's service area. Routes 600–649 consist of suburban local service. Routes 650–679 are non-stop services to Downtown Minneapolis operated by Metro Transit or contracts through the Metropolitan Council. Routes 680–699 are non-stop services to Downtown Minneapolis and the University of Minnesota operated by SouthWest Transit. Additionally, SW Prime is a demand-responsive transit service operated by SouthWest Transit covering east Carver County and southwest Hennepin County.

Routes 700–799
Routes 700–799 are suburban routes serving NW Hennepin County.

Routes 800–899 (North)
Routes 800–899 are routes operating from the north suburbs. Routes 800–849 consist of suburban local service, often operated by contracts through the Metropolitan Council. Routes 850–886 are non-stop services to Downtown Minneapolis and Downtown Saint Paul. Route 887 is the Northstar Link and Route 888 is the Northstar Line.

Routes 900–999 (Special)
Routes 900–999 are special services. Routes 900–929 are Metro lines, but numbers are not publicly advertised. Route 960 is seasonal State Fair service. Special or temporary routes occupy the 900s series.

Former Routes

Notes

References

External links 
 Metro Transit

 
Metro Transit Minnesota
Metro Transit routes